Wood is a town in Wood County, Wisconsin, United States. The population was 786 at the 2000 census.

Geography
According to the United States Census Bureau, the town has a total area of 33.3 square miles (86.4 km2), of which, 33.3 square miles (86.3 km2) of it is land and 0.04 square miles (0.1 km2) of it (0.12%) is water.

This town is sometime mistaken for the discontinued post office of Wood, Milwaukee County, Wisconsin (zip code 53193) that served the Veterans Administration Medical Center near Milwaukee (current address 5000 West National Ave. Milwaukee, WI 53295).

History
In the summer of 1851 a crew working for the U.S. government surveyed the outline of the six mile square that would become Wood. That November another crew marked all the section corners, walking through the woods and wading the swamps, measuring with chain and compass. When done, the deputy surveyor filed this general description:
There is very little good land in this Township  it may be considered as 2d rate the timber is generall good except the Pine although there is some good Pine along the Banks of Yellow River mixed in with hard timber the surface is generall level & somewhat stony particularly near(?) Yellow River which passes over almost entirely a Bed of Rocks the stone are a Reddish sandstone the timber is of various Kinds, such as Birch Pine Maple Linn Elm Tamarack etc(?) the small streams are fed by the swamp and are not durable the Saw Mills under process of Erection are probably worth $500 each.

Demographics
As of the census of 2000, there were 786 people, 285 households, and 222 families residing in the town. The population density was 23.6 people per square mile (9.1/km2). There were 309 housing units at an average density of 9.3 per square mile (3.6/km2). The racial makeup of the town was 99.24% White, 0.13% African American, 0.51% Native American and 0.13% Asian. Hispanic or Latino of any race were 0.13% of the population.

There were 285 households, out of which 34.4% had children under the age of 18 living with them, 66.3% were married couples living together, 4.9% had a female householder with no husband present, and 22.1% were non-families. 16.5% of all households were made up of individuals, and 4.9% had someone living alone who was 65 years of age or older. The average household size was 2.76 and the average family size was 3.12.

In the town, the population was spread out, with 24.7% under the age of 18, 8.4% from 18 to 24, 27.9% from 25 to 44, 26.1% from 45 to 64, and 13.0% who were 65 years of age or older. The median age was 39 years. For every 100 females, there were 112.4 males. For every 100 females age 18 and over, there were 116.1 males.

The median income for a household in the town was $44,853, and the median income for a family was $47,955. Males had a median income of $38,333 versus $22,321 for females. The per capita income for the town was $18,534. About 6.4% of families and 6.7% of the population were below the poverty line, including 13.4% of those under age 18 and none of those age 65 or over.

References

External links 
 1852 plat map covering town of Wood
 1879 plat map
 1896 plat map
 1909 plat map
 1928 plat map
 1956 plat map

Towns in Wood County, Wisconsin
Towns in Wisconsin